MV Yara Birkeland is an autonomous 120 TEU container ship sailing fertilizer between ports at Herøya and Brevik. The Yara Birkeland was designed to serve as a proof of concept for a fully autonomous ship capable of global travel and with multiple functions (from industrial site operations, port operations and vessel operations).

Construction
It is be propelled by electric motors driving two azimuth pods and two tunnel thrusters. It has a capacity of 120 TEU. Costing $25million (NOK250 million) it is designed by Marin Teknikk, with navigation equipment by Kongsberg Maritime. The Norwegian Government gave a grant of NOK133.6 million towards the construction of the ship, about a third of the total cost, in September 2017.

Operation
Yara Birkeland is named after its owners Yara International and its founder, Norwegian scientist Kristian Birkeland. Yara Birkeland sails between Herøya and Brevik (~) carrying chemicals and fertiliser, and is intended to reduce road truck traffic by 40,000 loads per year. In late November, 2021, the ship sailed to Oslo, where it was toured by the Prime Minister of Norway, Jonas Gahr Støre, on Friday, November 19, 2021. As of August 2021, remote operation was intended to start in late 2021, though regulatory obstacles may still remained ahead of its intended start of commercial operations in 2022. The ship was christened on April 29, 2022 in Brevik where 500 local students and Crown Prince Haakon was attending. Regulations require crew on board for two years before being considered for remote control.

Legacy
In 2019, the Yara Birkeland was a finalist in the competition for the annual Nor-Shipping Next Generation Ship award.

See also
Unmanned surface vehicle

References

External  links
Kongsberg video about Yara Birkeland
BBC video, August 2022

Merchant ships of Norway
Ships built in Norway
Autonomous ships
Electric ships
Trondheimsfjord